The 2016 Tour de France is the 103rd edition of the cycle race, one of cycling's Grand Tours. On 24 November 2014 Amaury Sport Organisation announced that the race would depart, on 2 July 2016, from the French department of Manche, for the first time in the history of the Tour de France. The race is also scheduled to have a stage finish in Andorra. The race will finish on the Champs-Élysées in Paris on 24 July.

Classification standings

Stage 1 
2 July 2016 — Mont Saint-Michel to Utah Beach, Sainte-Marie-du-Mont, 

The riders then passed through Granville, Montmartin-sur-Mer, Gouville-sur-Mer and Lessay. On moving inland to cross the peninsula, an intermediate sprint took place at La Haye. The race then continued through Saint-Sauveur-le-Vicomte, turning north-east to Montebourg, and over to the opposite coast at Quinéville. The riders then travelled south-east along the coast and turned inland south-west to Sainte-Mère-Église, before heading east to the finish line at Utah Beach. The stage ended with a sprint finish won by Mark Cavendish.

Stage 2 
3 July 2016 — Saint-Lô to Cherbourg-en-Cotentin, 

This hilly stage departed south-east from Saint-Lô to the Category 4 climb of the Côte de Torigny-les-Villes, then heading south-west to the Category 4 climb of the Côte de Montabot. The riders passed through Percy-en-Normandie and Hambye, reaching the Category 4 climb of the Côte de Montpinchon. The race then travelled north-west through Coutances, Montsurvent and Lessay. On reaching the coast at Bretteville-sur-Ay the race followed the coastline to an intermediate sprint at Portbail. The route then continued north through Barneville-Carteret, Les Pieux and Helleville to Sainte-Croix-Hague and turned west. Peter Sagan won the stage and took the lead of the race.

Stage 3 
4 July 2016 — Granville to Angers, 

This long and flat stage departed east from Granville to the Category 4 climb of the Côte de Villedieu-les-Poêles. The route then wound south through Brécey, Saint-Hilaire-du-Harcouët, Fougères, Gennes-sur-Seiche and Renazé, and turned south-east to an intermediate sprint at Bouillé-Ménard. The riders then continued through Segré, La Pouëze and La Meignanne to the finish at Angers. The sprint finish was won by Mark Cavendish.

Stage 4 
5 July 2016 — Saumur to Limoges, 

The longest stage of the year's tour, this flat stage departed south from Saumur to Montreuil-Bellay, turning south-east to Les Trois-Moutiers. The riders continued through Loudun, Châtellerault, Paizay-le-Sec, Saint-Savin and Montmorillon to an intermediate sprint at Le Dorat. The race then travelled over the Category 4 Côte de la Maison Neuve, and wound south through Roussac, Bonnac-la-Côte and Le Palais-sur-Vienne to the finish line at Limoges.

Stage 5 
6 July 2016 — Limoges to Le Lioran, 

This medium mountain stage departed east from Limoges, over the Category 4 Côte de Saint-Léonard-de-Noblat, through Bujaleuf and turning south-east to Eymoutiers. The riders continued through Bugeat and Meymac to Saint-Angel. The race then turned south to head through Neuvic before climbing the Category 3 Côte du Puy Saint-Mary, quickly followed by an intermediate sprint through Mauriac.

Stage 6 
7 July 2016 — Arpajon-sur-Cère to Montauban, 

This hilly to flat stage departed south from Arpajon-sur-Cère, through Montsalvy to Vieillevie. This then gently ascended into the intermediate sprint at Montbazens, where the route turned south-west. Following the descent south-west into Montricoux, the race continued through Saint-Étienne-de-Tulmont to a flat finish at Montauban.

Stage 7 
8 July 2016 — L'Isle-Jourdain to Lac de Payolle, 

This medium mountain stage departed from L'Isle-Jourdain, heading south-west through Lombez to Boulogne-sur-Gesse. The race then turned west travelling through Castelnau-Magnoac and Trie-sur-Baïse to Chelle-Debat. The route then turned south through Bordes and south-east to ascend the Category 4 Côte de Capvern, continuing without descent into La Barthe-de-Neste. The riders then had a  descent to the finish line at Lac de Payolle.

Steve Cummings won the stage with a solo attack. After the first five riders passed, the red inflatable  marker collapsed, blocking chasing riders, so the race organisation decided to use the timegaps measured at the  mark. Adam Yates was most affected by the collapsing flamme rouge, because he was 7 seconds in front of the other favorites at that moment, and the marker collapsed right in front of him, causing him to crash into it. After the podium ceremony the commissaires revised the result, moving Yates into second place on the General Classification and into the white jersey, which he wore non-stop for the remainder of the 2016 competition.

Stage 8 
9 July 2016 — Pau to Bagnères-de-Luchon, 

This mountainous stage departed from Pau, heading south-east, through Lestelle-Bétharram, to Lourdes. The race then turned south through Ayros-Arbouix and Villelongue, with an intermediate sprint at Esquièze-Sère, just before Luz-Saint-Sauveur.

Michael Mørkøv, who had been battling with injuries all week, became the first rider to withdraw from the tour. This set a new all-time record for the longest time in which the peloton had remained intact prior to the first withdrawal.

Chris Froome won the stage after surprisingly breaking away from a group of 14 riders just before the summit of the Col de Peyresourde, with about 15 km remaining. On the descent into Bagnères-de-Luchon he adopted a 'super aero' position, pedalling as he did so reaching a top speed of 90.9 km/h. With 10 km to go Froome opened up a gap of 11 seconds and he maintained the lead to the end, with the following pack finishing 13 seconds behind. With the time bonus, Froome took the yellow jersey for the first time in the race, wearing it non-stop through the remainder of the 2016 competition.

Stage 9 
10 July 2016 — Vielha Val d'Aran to Andorre Arcalis, 

The riders then headed south-east through La Guingueta d'Àneu, and turned south-west at Llavorsí, to the valley floor at Sort.

Two time overall winner Alberto Contador, one of the pre-race favorites, abandoned the Tour during Stage 9.

Rest day 1 
11 July 2016 — Andorra

Stage 10 
12 July 2016 — Escaldes-Engordany to Revel, 

The riders then descended north-east back into France to Ax-les-Thermes, and turned north-west still gradually descending towards Tarascon-sur-Ariège. The race then turned north-east towards Mercus-Garrabet and wound east through Nalzen to Lavelanet. The route continued north-east to an intermediate sprint at Aigues-Vives. The riders then continued north through Mirepoix, Plavilla, Fendeille and Castelnaudary reaching the short Category 3 climb of the Côte de Saint-Ferréol. The race then descended to the finish line in Revel. Peter Sagan took the green jersey for the third time in the 2016 competition, and wore it non-stop for the remainder of the Tour.

Stage 11 
13 July 2016 — Carcassonne to Montpellier, 

The riders then descended to Aigues-Vives, and turned north-east to climb the Category 4 Côte de Villespassans to  descending through Saint-Chinian to Cessenon-sur-Orb. Continuing east, the riders passed through Murviel-lès-Béziers, Magalas and Alignan-du-Vent to an intermediate sprint at Pézenas. The race then headed through Montagnac, passing Valmagne Abbey, and continuing on through Montbazin. Bearing towards the north-east, the race headed through Pignan to the finish line in Montpellier.

In a stage affected by crosswinds, a small group comprising the general classification leader Froome, the points leader Sagan and their respective team-mates Geraint Thomas and Maciej Bodnar escaped from the peloton 13 km from the finish, building a lead of as much as 26 seconds. Sagan eventually won the stage ahead of Froome and Bodnar, 6 seconds clear of the bunch. With his time bonus for finishing second, Froome increased his lead by 12 seconds overall.

References

External links 

2016 Tour de France
Tour de France stages